Willis Lincoln Blair (May 14, 1923 – April 5, 2014) was a Canadian politician and public servant who was mayor of the Metropolitan Toronto municipality of East York, Ontario from 1973 to 1976 and chairman of the Liquor Licensing Board of Ontario from 1981 to 1986.

Blair was born to the descendants of Scottish immigrants to Canada in the town of West Zorra and grew up on his parents' dairy farm, the eldest of eight children.

During World War II he enlisted in the Royal Canadian Air Force serving on home soil as a mechanic and test pilot. After the war he attended the University of Toronto where he became president of the campus Progressive Conservative club. After graduating he worked for Canada Life as an insurance broker.

Blair became involved in municipal politics and was elected an alderman on East York's town council in 1958 and would serve on council for 18 years. He was elected mayor of what was by then the borough of East York in the 1972 municipal election, succeeding True Davidson, and took office on January 1, 1973. Blair was re-elected to a second two-year term in 1974 but resigned in 1976 to accept an appointment to the Ontario Municipal Board.  During his term as mayor, he was instrumental in East York becoming host city for the first World Junior Curling Championships in 1975.

Blair also served on Metropolitan Toronto Council from 1967 to 1976. He worked closely with Metro Toronto Chairman Paul Godfrey and others in the successful bid to convince Major League Baseball to award Toronto what became the Toronto Blue Jays franchise, and helped ensure that Exhibition Stadium was renovated to accommodate major league baseball.

In the late 1970s, Blair was appointed by the provincial government of Bill Davis to head a commission examining how property tax rates should be set. He was then appointed to serve as the chair of the Liquor Licensing Board of Ontario from 1981 to 1986.

He died in Toronto on April 5, 2014 at the age of 90 and was survived by his wife Elsie, their children, grandchildren and great-grandchildren.

References

See also
List of mayors of East York

1923 births
2014 deaths
Mayors of East York, Ontario
University of Toronto alumni
Metropolitan Toronto councillors
People from Oxford County, Ontario